Jennifer "Jenny" Laurendet (née Low; born 5 July 1962) is a retired Australian hurdler. She represented her country in the 400 metres hurdles at the 1988 Summer Olympics as well as three Commonwealth Games and the 1987 World Championships.

Her personal best in the 400 metres hurdles is 56.31 seconds set in Sydney in 1989.

International competitions

References

1962 births
Living people
Australian female hurdlers
Olympic athletes of Australia
Athletes (track and field) at the 1988 Summer Olympics
Commonwealth Games medallists in athletics
Commonwealth Games bronze medallists for Australia
Athletes (track and field) at the 1982 Commonwealth Games
Athletes (track and field) at the 1986 Commonwealth Games
Athletes (track and field) at the 1990 Commonwealth Games
World Athletics Championships athletes for Australia
Australian people of Chinese descent
21st-century Australian women
20th-century Australian women
Medallists at the 1986 Commonwealth Games
Medallists at the 1990 Commonwealth Games